Dcypha Productions (sometimes credited as Dcypha Records or simply just Dcypha) is a UK-based production group founded by Sway and established under Akon's Konvict Records.

Background
Sway established Dcypha Productions, in 2004, to enable him to release his mixtapes and debut solo album This Is My Demo. The first members of Dcypha Productions were Sway, Bigz and Pyrelli. Soon after Sway appointed DJ/Producer DJ Turkish and producer Shux to Dcypha Productions. Shux and Sway produced most of This Is My Demo which was critically received and reached the UK Top 100 and had two Top 50 Singles. Sway‘s second album The Signature LP was released in 2008 which was released under Akon’s Konvict Muzik. Sway signed Silverstone to his label as a producer shortly before the album’s release and he produced a track on the album. Silverstone is an accomplished producer amongst UK Hip-Hop and is talented with different instruments. Shortly after the album’s release Sway also signed the final member of Dcypha Productions in a young upcoming producer called Louis Gibzen.

Artists pasts and present
 Sway
 Tiggs Da Author
 DJ Turkish
KSI
 Lunar C
 D.Tail
 Sam Garrett
 Britizen Kane
 Aaron Davies

Notes
The name "Dcypha" is actually mentioned at the beginning of a few of Sway's songs, most notably "the arrival of Dcypha" at the beginning of "This Is My Demo" and "the return of Dcypha" at the beginning of "Fit 4 A King". Lyrics of these and other songs that name-drop the label commonly misinterpret the lyric, hearing and transcribing it as either "decipher", "decihper" or "cyphaa", among a few other oddball interpretations.<ref>Lyric website genius.com</span> notably has the lyric correctly interpreted, though only in "This Is My Demo"'s case, as the lyric page for "Fit 4 A King" still cites the lyric as "Cyphaa"</ref>

References

External links
 Dcypha Productions

British record labels
Record labels based in London
Record labels established in 2004
Hip hop record labels